Ken J. E. Jones (born May 11, 1939) was a Canadian politician. He served in the Legislative Assembly of British Columbia from 1991 to 1996, as a Liberal member for the constituency of Surrey-Cloverdale.

References

1939 births
British Columbia Liberal Party MLAs
Living people
People from Port Alberni